Nuʿmān ibn Bashīr al-Anṣārī (c. 622–684) was a Companion of the Islamic prophet Muhammad. He was also a commander and statesman of the Umayyad Caliphate. A supporter of Mu'awiya ibn Abi Sufyan during the First Muslim Civil War, he was appointed by him governor of Kufa in 678–680. Afterward, he was made governor of Homs by Caliph Yazid I. After the latter's death, he gave allegiance to the Mecca-based, Caliph Abd Allah ibn al-Zubayr. When pro-Umayyad forces routed Ibn al-Zubayr's supporters in Syria, he fled Homs but was slain during his escape.

Life
Nu'man ibn Bashir belonged to the Ansar, which consisted of the Arab tribes that were native to Medina, and according to some Muslim authorities, he was the first member of the Ansar to be born after the Hijrah, the Islamic prophet Muhammad's migration to Medina. His father, Bashir ibn Sa'd, was a distinguished companion of Muhammad, and his mother, Amra bint Rawaha, was a sister of another noted Ansari companion, Abd Allah ibn Rawaha. 

Nu'man was dedicated to avenging the death of Caliph Uthman and was a vociferous opponent of Caliph Ali. He became a loyalist of the governor of Syria, Mu'awiya ibn Abi Sufyan, during the latter's conflict with Ali and participated in the Battle of Siffin in 657, distinguishing himself from most of the Ansar, who were generally aligned with Ali. In 659, Nu'man led an expedition against a garrison of Ali's troops at Ayn al-Tamr in the desert region south of Hit, west of the Euphrates, but was repulsed. At some point following the death of Mu'awiya's governor of Jund Hims (the military district of Homs), Abd al-Rahman ibn Khalid ibn al-Walid, in 666, Mu'awiya, who had become caliph in 661, appointed Nu'man, who had since settled in Homs, as his governor there.

In 678, Nu'man was appointed governor of Kufa by Mu'awiya. In 680, Mu'awiya died and was succeeded by his son Yazid I, who afterward replaced Nu'man with Ubayd Allah ibn Ziyad in 680, partly as a result of Nu'man's lax response to the anti-Umayyad activities of Muslim ibn Aqil, who was rallying support in the city for Husayn ibn Ali. In 682, Yazid dispatched Nu'man to Medina to reconcile the Ansar to his caliphate, but he was unable to obtain their support. After Yazid's death, Nu'man recognized the Mecca-based, anti-Umayyad caliph Abd Allah ibn al-Zubayr, who appointed Nu'man to his old provincial post in Homs. This aligned him with the Qaysi tribes which dominated northern Syria and the governors of Damascus and Palestine, al-Dahhak ibn Qays al-Fihri and Natil ibn Qays al-Judhami. The two sides met at the Battle of Marj Rahit in 684, during which Nu'man dispatched Shurahbil ibn Dhi'l-Kala and the latter's Himyari tribesmen from the Homs garrison to join al-Dahhak. After receiving reports that the Qaysi tribes led by al-Dahhak were routed by the pro-Umayyad Banu Kalb, Nu'man fled Homs with his wife, Na'ila bint Umara, who was previously married to Mu'awiya, and his children, but was pursued and slain by members of the Homs garrison. His wife and children were spared and came under the protection of the Banu Kalb, his wife's tribe.

Descendants and legacy
One of his daughters, Amra, was wed to the pro-Alid ruler of Kufa, al-Mukhtar al-Thaqafi. After al-Mukhtar was killed by Zubayrid forces in 687, Amra was imprisoned and executed for not condemning her slain husband. Upon hearing the news of her death, Nu'man's son Aban assaulted her executioner and was arrested but released by the Zubayrids. Another of Nu'man's daughters, Umm Aban, was later married to al-Hajjaj ibn Yusuf. At least three of Nu'man's descendants became transmitters of hadith in the mid-8th century and the family of Nu'man militarily supported Caliph al-Walid II against Yazid III during the Third Muslim Civil War in 744. Despite his family's alignment against Yazid III, Nu'man's grandson, Abd al-Samad ibn Aban, was appointed the lieutenant governor of Kufa under the Umayyad governor of Iraq, Abdallah ibn Umar ibn Abd al-Aziz, after Yazid III became caliph in the aftermath of al-Walid II's slaying in 744. According to the medieval Arabic geographers, the city of Ma'arrat al-Nu'man was named in honor of Nu'man.

References

Bibliography

684 deaths
Ansar (Islam)
People of the First Fitna
Umayyad governors of Hims
Umayyad governors of Kufa
622 births
Sahabah hadith narrators